William Augustine Shands (July 21, 1889 – January 20, 1973)  was an American politician and elected officeholder.  Shands was a long-time Democratic member of the Florida Senate and an advocate for the establishment of a state medical college and teaching hospital.

Early life and education 

Shands was born in Alachua County, Florida on July 21, 1889, and moved to Gainesville, Florida with his family in 1901.  He attended the University of Florida in Gainesville, where he joined the Kappa Alpha Order Fraternity (Beta Zeta Chapter).  While attending the university, he played for the Florida football and Florida baseball teams. On the football team he was an end and halfback. He left school without graduating which is something he regretted and went into the fertilizer business in Gainesville. He was later inducted into the University of Florida Athletic Hall of Fame as a "distinguished letter winner."

Business and politics 

Shands left the university before graduating and began selling agricultural chemicals for the Standard Fertilizer Company He married Catherine London Hawkins of Jacksonville, Florida on June 12, 1912, and then moved to Alabama.  He later returned to Gainesville and started the Gainesville Poster-Advertising Company in 1928.  He ran and was elected to the Gainesville City Council.  He joined the City Charter Commission, and in 1929 was appointed to the State Road Board.  In order to further his business and political aspirations, he returned to the University of Florida to study law.

State senate and legacy 

After graduating from the University of Florida with his bachelor of laws degree, Shands was elected to the Florida Senate in 1940, representing the 32nd District centered on Gainesville in north central Florida.  Shands was later selected by his colleagues to serve as the president of the Florida Senate during the 1957 session of the legislature.

Shands was a Democratic candidate for Florida Governor in 1948, but lost the Democratic Party primary to the eventual general election winner, Fuller Warren. During the primary campaign, Shands advocated the adoption of a state sales tax, which was opposed by Warren. The Florida Legislature adopted Shands' sales tax proposal over Warren's objections in the following session of the Florida Legislature, and it has remained the mainstay of state revenue ever since.

Shands became a forceful advocate of establishing a state-funded medical and teaching hospital at the University of Florida.  The University of Florida College of Medicine opened in 1956.  Two years later, the University of Florida Teaching Hospital opened on October 20, 1958.  In 1965, it was renamed the "William A. Shands Teaching Hospital and Clinics" in his honor.  The hospital is often referred to as "Shands Hospital," and is part of the Shands HealthCare network.

Shands was initiated as an honorary member of the Alpha Phi chapter of Alpha Kappa Psi Professional Business Fraternity in 1955.

Shands died in Gainesville in January 1973; he was 83 years old.

See also 

 Florida Gators
 Florida Gators football, 1906–09
 History of the University of Florida
 List of Kappa Alpha Order members
 List of Levin College of Law graduates
 List of University of Florida alumni
 List of University of Florida Athletic Hall of Fame members
 List of University of Florida honorary degree recipients

References

Bibliography 

 Carlson, Norm, University of Florida Football Vault: The History of the Florida Gators, Whitman Publishing, LLC, Atlanta, Georgia (2007).  .
 Golenbock, Peter, Go Gators!  An Oral History of Florida's Pursuit of Gridiron Glory, Legends Publishing, LLC, St. Petersburg, Florida (2002).  .
 Hairston, Jack, Tales from the Gator Swamp: A Collection of the Greatest Gator Stories Ever Told, Sports Publishing, LLC, Champaign, Illinois (2002).  .
 McCarthy, Kevin M., Fightin' Gators: A History of University of Florida Football, Arcadia Publishing, Mount Pleasant, South Carolina (2000).  .
 McEwen, Tom, The Gators: A Story of Florida Football, The Strode Publishers, Huntsville, Alabama (1974).  .
 Nash, Noel, ed., The Gainesville Sun Presents The Greatest Moments in Florida Gators Football, Sports Publishing, Inc., Champaign, Illinois (1998).  
 Proctor, Samuel, & Wright Langley, Gator History: A Pictorial History of the University of Florida, South Star Publishing Company, Gainesville, Florida (1986).  .

1889 births
1973 deaths
Florida Gators football players
Florida lawyers
Democratic Party Florida state senators
People from Gainesville, Florida
Presidents of the Florida Senate
Fredric G. Levin College of Law alumni
20th-century American politicians
Pork Chop Gang
20th-century American lawyers